Muklom is a subtribe of the Tangsa people residing in the Khimiyang circle, in and around Changlang and Miao subdivision of the Changlang district of Arunachal Pradesh, India.

References

Tribes of Arunachal Pradesh
Changlang district